Ramsey Creek may refer to the following streams:

Ramsey Creek (Iowa)
Ramsey Creek (Minnesota)
Ramsey Creek (Castor River Diversion Channel), a stream in Missouri
Ramsey Creek (Mississippi River), a stream in Missouri